Norwich Airport  is an international airport in Hellesdon, Norfolk, England,  north of Norwich. In 2017, Norwich Airport was the 28th busiest airport in the UK and busiest in the East Anglia region.

Norwich Airport has a CAA Public Use Aerodrome Licence that allows flights for the public transport of passengers or for flying instruction. Along with a long history of flights to Amsterdam Airport Schiphol via KLM Cityhopper, it offers flights to various destinations in the United Kingdom and Europe. Besides the commercial flights, charter operators also operate out of Norwich. Bristow Helicopters, DanCopter and Babcock Mission Critical Services Offshore fly crews to North Sea gas rigs and SaxonAir operates executive, private aircraft and helicopter charter flights.

The airport was established on the site of a former RAF base in the early 1970s under the ownership of the local authorities. It was later sold into private ownership.

History
The first Norwich Airport was set up on a former First World War aerodrome on Mousehold Heath under what is now the Heartsease housing estate. It opened in 1933, and was used by Boulton & Paul for aircraft test flying and other recreational activities. This fell into disuse in the early part of the Second World War.

RAF Horsham St Faith

The current site, formerly known as Royal Air Force Station Horsham St Faith, or more commonly RAF Horsham St Faith, was first developed in 1939 and officially opened on 1 June 1940 as a Royal Air Force (RAF) bomber station. In September 1942 Horsham St. Faith was made available to the United States Army Air Forces (USAAF) for use by the Eighth Air Force. The USAAF designated the airfield as Station 123 (HF).

The airfield was transferred to RAF Fighter Command on 10 July 1945 when it was occupied by four Gloster Meteor Squadrons. RAF Horsham St. Faith was a front-line RAF station for many years, and its squadrons participated in many post-war exercises. The station was deactivated on 1 August 1963.

Civil airport

The RAF left Horsham on 24 March 1967. Over the following two years the major part of the airfield and buildings were sold to Norwich City and Norfolk County Council, a small part being retained by the Ministry of Defence (MoD). Norwich Airport Ltd., under ownership of the county and city councils, developed the modern day Norwich International Airport, with the main terminal opening in 1988. In 1971 the airport began operations with charter flights, with airline Air Anglia creating a base at the airfield, offering flights all over northwestern Europe. Their route to Amsterdam is still operated today with KLM Cityhopper.

Most of the World War II buildings used by the USAAF remain, although converted for a variety of purposes. Two of the five large pre-war hangars are still being used for aircraft maintenance. One of the other three has been converted into an aviation academy, the remaining two have been converted for commercial use by Air Livery and KLM UK Engineering. The original control tower still exists although the top has been restored and a new tower has been built adjacent to the present main runway. Other wartime buildings now form part of the airport industrial estate (owned by the county and city councils) and are intermingled with many newer structures. Adjacent to the airport terminal building opened by the Queen Mother, there is a memorial display relating to the USAAF, consisting of photographs, paintings, and a plaque commemorating the American use of the airfield.

The airport also features the private City of Norwich Aviation Museum to the north of the site by the control tower, commemorating the airfield's history as a military airfield and development as a civil airport through the years, with many civil and military aircraft on display - many of which served from the aerodrome at some point in their lifetime.

The former RAF accommodation blocks situated towards Old Catton were until 1993 used by the University of East Anglia as accommodation for students; known to students as "Fifers Lane" halls, these have since been demolished and the site redeveloped as housing. The remaining MoD property—airmen's married quarters—continued to be used for nearby RAF stations, but due to the closure of these stations, the housing has been sold to private buyers.

Whilst most runways and taxiways from the military airfield remain, only one runway is primarily used, to avoid takeoffs and landings over built-up areas: Runway 09/27, which was extended eastwards by the RAF in 1956 to 1,841 metres long. The old 04/22 runway is no longer used for takeoffs or landings, but is used for parking and taxiing of aircraft.

In 1999, the new corporate identity was launched as Norwich International Airport, kept until April 2017.

In March 2004, the city and county councils sold 80.1% of Norwich Airport Ltd. to Omniport, whilst retaining the remaining 19.9%. Omniport has also acquired 100% of Norwich Airport Travel Ltd. Since the sale to Omniport the airport became one of the UK hubs for budget airline Flybe and the number of flights and destinations served increased. In 2005 a £3.5 million terminal expansion programme began.

In 2009, during filming of the BBC show Top Gear, operations from the airport appeared to be disrupted when a caravan, adapted into an airship and flown by James May, drifted overhead the airport, infringing its controlled airspace. In reality, the event occurred after much pre-planning between the airport authorities and the BBC; and scenes showing the airship in the airfield boundary were actually filmed after it had lifted off from the airfield to satisfy the requirements of the film crew.

In 2007, the airport introduced its Airport Development Fee (ADF). All passengers over 16 departing from the airport pay a fee of £10. The airport was sold in 2014 by the majority stakeholders of Omniport to the Rigby Group, who integrated the airport as part of Regional & City Airports in April 2017.

Recent developments 
Norwich International Airport announced in 2015 that four new routes were being considered for Department for Transport (DfT) funding. The routes being considered included: Dublin Airport (Flybe, double daily return weekdays, single return weekends), Paris Charles de Gaulle Airport (Flybe, daily return), Newcastle Airport (Links Air, double daily weekday return), and Exeter Airport (Flybe, daily return). Links Air proposed a start date of 1 September 2016, but the airline was put into liquidation. In November 2015 it was announced that bids for routes to Newcastle and Exeter had been successful, with the inaugural flight to the latter on 24 March 2016, operated by Flybe. Flybe also confirmed plans to operate summer sun and winter ski routes from Norwich Airport as part of a five-year deal with the Regional & City Airports (RCA) group. From May 2016, one of Flybe's Embraer ERJ-195 aircraft began operating multi-weekly flights from Norwich to Alicante and Málaga.

In 2016 an engine test facility opened on site. The KLM UK Engineering Academy opened on 18 April 2017.

On 6 July 2017, Managing Director Richard Pace announced a 30-year vision to treble passenger numbers at the airport. The plans include raising annual passenger numbers to 930,000 by 2030, and 1.4 million by 2045, forging new routes to Paris Charles de Gaulle and Dublin to boost the choice of worldwide destinations and constructing a 100-acre business park for both aviation and non-aviation companies - it was originally frozen by investors in 2015 waiting for the new Northern Distributor Road to be completed. Further plans include extending Runway 27/09 by 500 metres and building new taxiways to boost capacity and allow larger aircraft to operate to the airport. Another 10-year ambition is seeking permission to allow flights to fly until up to 01:30 (currently, the curfew is put in place at 23:00, with the airport placing charges for any arrivals after 21:30) for four nights a week. Pace says the new Broadland Northway (NDR) is "unlocking the potential for the site to generate growth for the region and the airport," and "the masterplan sets out the vision for the future development of Norwich Airport and its continued vital role in supporting our region’s economy."

On 10 November 2017, a discussion between the airport, Norwich City Council, Broadland District Council and Norfolk County Council took place on the possible relocation of the Mile Cross Recycling Centre in Norwich, whose contract ends in 2021. County Hall put aside £2.75m in funding for the new centre, which was approved in February. The move was floated due to Norfolk County Council wanting to integrate its highway maintenance, fleet vehicle storage, park and ride and a strategic salt store into one location, called the Norwich Depot Hub. This would have been located north of the airport, near the new Northern Distributor Road, which the Council claimed would offer easier access than to the current site in the city; however, this was scrapped when councillors were told it would not make enough savings to justify the outlay. A new site has been identified north of the Broadland Northway (near its junction with the A140), which is jointly owned by the City Council and County Hall, whilst negotiations are underway with the private owner of the land required for an access road.

A refurbishment of the terminal commenced in April 2018, to be completed in Spring 2019, increasing the number of retail shops and dining options for passengers. The airport also invested in upgrade and refurbishment works to the Executive Lounge at the airport, completed in May 2018.

Flybe announced in April 2019 that they would be ending jet flights from Norwich Airport as of Winter 2019/20 due to them returning their Embraer 195 aircraft back to the lessors.

In July 2019, Norfolk County Council and Norwich City Council sold their remaining 19.9% stake in the airport to Regional and City Airports.

Facilities

Runway and apron
The airport has one runway (designated 09/27),  in length. A smaller  runway (designated 04/22) was closed in 2006, and is now used as a taxiway (south of Runway 09/27) and parking area for decommissioned aircraft (north of Runway 09/27). The airport has nine parking stands for commercial aircraft.

Tenants
Operators based at Norwich are CHC Scotia, Bristow Helicopters, NHV Helicopters, SaxonAir Charter & SaxonAir Flight Support and the East Anglian Air Ambulance.

Airlines and destinations

The following airlines operate regular scheduled services to and from Norwich:

Accidents and incidents
 On 12 December 1973 a Dassault Falcon 20 of Fred. Olsen Airtransport suffered a bird strike on takeoff from Runway 27. Both engines failed and the aircraft made an emergency landing in a field. All three crew members were injured but the passengers sustained no injuries. The aircraft was written off.
 On 25 October 1974 a Cessna 310 dived into the ground while on final approach, killing the pilot. The Cessna's nose pitched down and the wings rolled over; the loss of control was caused by the uncommanded retraction of the starboard flap, caused by the failure of the drive mechanism.

Statistics
2019 CAA statistical data for Norwich Airport revealed a total aircraft movement count of 19,729, giving an average rate of 54 movements per day. Total passenger numbers for 2017 were recorded as 530,328.

Public transport

Bus
KonectBus operates the 501 Norwich Park and Ride service, connecting the airport with Norwich city centre, six days a week (excluding Sundays), up to every 15 minutes. The first bus departs Norwich Airport at 06:35 and the last at 20:10.

Road
Norwich Airport is situated adjacent to the A140, Cromer Road, which runs from Ipswich, through Norwich and on to the seaside town of Cromer; this also provides easy road access to Norwich city centre. The entrance to the airport is around three miles (4.78 km) from the city centre. The A1270 Broadland Northway (also known as the Norwich Northern Distributor Road) links the airport to the A47 to Great Yarmouth in the east and Fakenham in the west as well as Norwich itself.

Rail

References

Bibliography
 Freeman, Roger A. (1978) Airfields of the Eighth: Then and Now. After the Battle 
 Maurer, Maurer (1983). Air Force Combat Units Of World War II. Maxwell AFB, Alabama: Office of Air Force History.

External links

Airports in Norfolk
Airports established in 1940
Norwich
Transport in Norwich
1940 establishments in England
Airports in England